Turan may refer to:
 Turan, Isfahan (طوران - Ţūrān)
 Turan-e Fars (توران - Tūrān), Golestan Province
 Turan-e Tork (توران - Tūrān), Golestan Province